Star of the East  may refer to:

 Barney Aaron, English lightweight champion boxer
 Evening Star (Ipswich), a newspaper which had this title 1885-1893
 Umm Kulthum (singer) (1904-1975), an Egyptian singer
 Star of the East (diamond), a 94-carat (18.8 g) diamond
 An illuminated art-work in Mablethorpe, Lincolnshire
 "Star of the East" (song), a Christmas carol
 The Star of the East, nickname of snooker player Ding Junhui
 The Star of the East, a ship appearing in an urban legend about a man called James Bartley who supposedly survived being swallowed by a whale
 , a Soviet literary magazine published in Uzbek SSR

Star in the East may refer to:

 The Order of the Star in the East, a theosophical organisation
 The Star of Bethlehem (referring to Matthew 2:2)
 A hymn:
 "Lo! The Star in the East! Over Bethlehem's Plain" by J. M. Lowrie, in The Silver Song, by William Augustine Ogden
 "Brightest and Best", also known as "Star in the East"

See also 
 Star of the West (disambiguation)
 East Star (disambiguation)
 Eastern Star (disambiguation)